2-Iodoacetamide is an alkylating agent used for peptide mapping purposes. Its actions are similar to those of iodoacetate. It is commonly used to bind covalently with the thiol group of cysteine so the protein cannot form disulfide bonds. Also used in ubiquitin studies as an inhibitor of deubiquitinase enzymes (DUBs) because it alkylates the cysteine residues at the DUB active site.

Peptidase inhibitor
Iodoacetamide is an irreversible inhibitor of all cysteine peptidases, with the mechanism of inhibition occurring from alkylation of the catalytic cysteine residue (see schematic). In comparison with its acid derivative, iodoacetate, iodoacetamide reacts substantially faster. This observation appears contradictory to standard chemical reactivity, however the presence of a favourable interaction between the positive imidazolium ion of the catalytic histidine and the negatively charged carboxyl-group of the iodoacetate is the reason for the increased relative activity of iodoacetamide.

Protein mass spectrometry
It is commonly used during the sample preparation for de novo (peptide) sequencing with protein mass spectrometry, but recent critics suggest to avoid the use of it

References

External links
The MEROPS online database for peptidases and their inhibitors: 

Alkylating agents
Organoiodides
Acetamides